Colonia Esperanza is a colonia located in the municipality of Julimes, in the northern Mexican state of Chihuahua.

References

Populated places in Chihuahua (state)